Susan Musgrave (born March 12, 1951) is a Canadian poet and children's writer. She was born in Santa Cruz, California, to Canadian parents, and currently lives in British Columbia, dividing her time between Sidney and Haida Gwaii. She has been nominated several times for Canada's Governor General literary awards.

Musgrave left school at 14, and had her first works published at 16. In 1986, at a wedding held in prison, she married Stephen Reid, a writer, convicted bank robber and former member of the infamous band of thieves known as the Stopwatch Gang. Their relationship was chronicled in 1999 in the CBC series The Fifth Estate.

Musgrave defended Al Purdy's collection of poetry, Rooms for Rent in the Outer Planets: Selected Poems, 1962–1996, in Canada Reads 2006, a nationally broadcast radio "battle of the books" competition.

She currently teaches creative writing in the University of British Columbia's optional residency Master of Fine Arts program.

Musgrave's archives are held by the William Ready Division of Archives and Research Collections at McMaster University.

Bibliography

Poetry
Songs of the Sea-Witch — 1970
Entrance of the Celebrant — 1972
Grave-Dirt and Selected Strawberries — 1973
Gullband Thought Measles was a Happy Ending — 1974
The Impstone — 1976
Selected Strawberries and Other Poems — 1977
Kiskatinaw Songs — 1978
Becky Swan's Book — 1978
A Man to Marry, A Man to Bury — 1979 (nominated for a Governor General's Award)
Tarts and Muggers — 1982
Right through the Heart — 1982
Cocktails at the Mausoleum — 1985
The Embalmer's Art — 1991
Forcing the Narcissus — 1994
Things That Keep and Do Not Change — 1999
What the Small Day Cannot Hold: Collected Poems 1970-1985 — 2000
When the World Is Not Our Home: Selected Poems 1985-2000 — 2009
Obituary of Light: the Sangan River Meditations — 2009
Origami Dove — 2011

Fiction
The Charcoal Burners — 1980 (nominated for a Governor General's Award)
The Dancing Chicken — 1987
Cargo of Orchids — 2000
Given — 2012

Non-fiction
Great Musgrave — 1989
Musgrave Landing: Musings on the Writing Life — 1994
You're in Canada Now... Motherfucker: A Memoir of Sorts — 2005
A Taste of Haida Gwaii: Food Gathering and Feasting at the Edge of the World — 2015

Children's literature
Gullband — 1980
Hag Head — 1980
Kestrel and Leonardo — 1990
Dreams Are More Real than Bathtubs — 1998
Kiss, Tickle, Cuddle, Hug" — 2012Love You More  — 2012

Compiled or edited by MusgraveBecause You Loved Being a Stranger: 55 Poets Celebrate Patrick Lane — 1994Nerves Out Loud: Critical Moments in the Lives of Seven Teen Girls — 2001You Be Me: Friendship in the Lives of Teen Girls — 2002The Fed Anthology — 2003Certain Things About My Mother: Daughters Speak — 2003Perfectly Secret: The Hidden Lives of Seven Teen Girls'' — 2004

Song lyrics
"Ode to the missing but not forgotten" — 2006 (performed by the guitarist Brad Prevedoros and singer Amber Smith)

References

External links
 Susan Musgrave's website
 
 Musgrave at "English-Canadian writers", Athabasca University, by J. McKay. Additional Link: Bibliography of works about Musgrave

1951 births
Living people
20th-century Canadian novelists
20th-century Canadian poets
21st-century Canadian novelists
21st-century Canadian poets
Canadian children's writers
Canadian women novelists
Canadian women poets
Canadian women children's writers
20th-century Canadian women writers
21st-century Canadian women writers